The 2021 European Junior Judo Championships was an edition of the European U21 Judo Championships, organised by the European Judo Union. The final day of competition featured a mixed team event, won by team France.

Event videos
The event aired freely on the European Judo Union YouTube channel.

Medal overview

Men

Women

Mixed

Source Results

Medal table

References

External links
 

 U21
European Junior Judo Championships
Judo
European Championships, U21
International sports competitions hosted by Luxembourg
European Judo U21 Championships